HSwMS Najaden is a Swedish Navy training ship launched in 1897, previously preserved as a museum ship in Halmstad and moored on the river Nissan by Halmstad Castle, since July 2014 in Fredrikstad, Norway.

The three-masted, wooden hulled sailing ship was constructed at the Royal Naval Shipyard in Karlskrona in 1897 and served in the Swedish Navy as a sail training ship until 1938.

In 1946 she was taken over by the city of Halmstad and completely restored. She now serves as a museum ship and is in the care of the Association of the Friends of Najaden (Föreningen Najadens Vänner).

Najaden passed into Norwegian ownership Friday, July 4, 2014. A brief ceremony led by city council's chairman, Conservative Ann-Charlotte Westlund was held in front of Najaden in central Halmstad. At that time about 200 protesters demonstrated against the sale of the ship to Norway.

On Saturday, July 5, 2014, Najaden was towed from Halmstad to its new home port in Fredrikstad, Norway.
The sail training ship af Chapman was a contemporary of Najaden in Swedish Navy service.

See also
 HMS Najaden (1834)
 List of museum ships
 List of ships of the Swedish Navy
 List of tall ships
 Tall Ships' Races

References

External links

 Föreningen Najadens Vänner
SVT 1936 archive film of school ships Najaden and af Chapman

Tall ships of Sweden
Individual sailing vessels
Museum ships in Sweden
1897 ships
Museums in Halland County
Auxiliary ships of the Swedish Navy
Ships built in Karlskrona